Epitettix parallelus is a species of ground-hoppers (Orthoptera: Caelifera), from Vietnam and not assigned to any tribe.

This was previously considered a species in the monotypic genus Vaotettix Podgornaya, 1986, in the subfamily Metrodorinae, then V. parallelus was moved to Epitettix in 2021.

References

External links 
 

Tetrigidae
Caelifera genera
Orthoptera of Indo-China